The Seri Bestari Bridge is a large arch bridge in Putrajaya, Malaysia. The eastern end of the bridge starts in Precinct 16 and the western end starts near Wisma Putra on Core Island.

The bridge has a total length of 152.6 meters with a main span of 60 meters.

See also
 Transport in Malaysia

Bridges in Putrajaya